Vittorio is an Italian male given name which has roots from the Byzantine-Bulgarian name Victor.

People with the given name Vittorio include:
 Vittorio Emanuele, Prince of Naples, pretender to the former Kingdom of Italy
 Vittorio Adorni, professional road racing cyclist
 Vittorio Alfieri, dramatist and poet
 Vittorio Amandola (1952–2010), Italian actor and voice actor
 Vittorio De Angelis (1962–2015), Italian voice actor
 Vittorio Brambilla (1937–2001) Italian Formula One racing driver
 Vittorio Caprioli, actor, director and screenwriter 
 Vittorio Cecchi Gori (born 1942), Italian film producer and politician
 Vittorio Cini (1885–1977), Italian industrialist and politician
 Vittorio Cottafavi, director and screenwriter 
 Vittorio Gallinari, basketball player
 Vittorio Gassman (1922–2000), Italian actor and director
 Vittorio Giannini, neoromantic composer of operas
 Vittorio Guerrieri, Italian voice actor
 Vittorio Giardino, comic artist
 Vittorio Goretti, astronomer
 Vittorio Grigolo, operatic tenor
 Vittorio Grilli, Italian economist and academic
 Vittorio Gui, conductor and composer
 Vittorio Iannuzzo, motorcycle racer
 Vittorio Marzotto, racing driver
 Vittorio Mezzogiorno, actor
 Vittorio Missoni, Italian fashion designer and former CEO of Missoni
 Vittorio Monti, composer, violinist and conductor 
 Vittorio Mussolini, film critic and producer
 Vittorio Pozzo,  football coach
 Vittorio Di Prima (1941–2016), Italian voice actor
 Vittorio Sentimenti, Italian football player 
 Vittorio De Seta, director and screenwriter
 Vittorio De Sica (1901–1974), Italian director and actor
 Vittorio Sgarbi,  art critic and politician
 Vittorio Storaro, cinematographer
 Vittorio Taviani, director and screenwriter 
 Vittorio Vidali, politician

Fictional Characters 

 Vittorio Antonio "Vito" Scaletta, from Mafia
 Vittorio Veneto, from Azur Lane

Italian masculine given names